The Kidnapping of Lola (Spanish:El secuestro de Lola) is a 1986 Mexican action film directed by Raúl Fernández and starring Rosa Gloria Chagoyán, Rolando Fernández and Frank Moro. It is a sequel to the 1983 hit Lola the Truck Driver, and is sometimes known as Lola the Truck Driver 2. Another sequel Lola the Truck Driver 3 followed in 1991.

Cast
 Rosa Gloria Chagoyán as Lola Chagano  
 Rolando Fernández as Jorge Stander  
 Frank Moro as El Maestro  
 Isela Vega 
 Emilio Fernández as Commander Prieto  
 Xavier Rizzo as Former Police Officer  
 Joaquín García Vargas as Lola's Godfather  
 Famie Kaufman as Ana Paula  
 María Cardinal 
 Edna Bolkan
 Sergio Ramos 
 Isaura Espinoza 
 Wolf Ruvinskis 
 Juan Gallardo
 Ricardo Carrión as Former Brawler  
 Alfredo Wally Barrón
 Paco Sañudo as Gay at Ana Paula's  
 Luis Manuel Pelayo 
 Ernesto Burgueño 
 Carlos Rotzinger 
 Lucía Gálvez 
 Toño Camacho
 Jasmin Lira 
 Marcia Bell 
 Rene Vela 
 Minu Caronni 
 Jose Antonio Woorlich 
 Sergio Sánchez 
 Maria Eugenia Plascencia S.
 Carlos Teran 
 Fernando Moncada 
 Sonia Camacho 
 Miguel Ángel Fuentes
 Juan Barahona
 Licia Suarez 
 Javier Arteaga 
 José Antonio Marros
 Josefina de Manzano

References

Bibliography 
 David Maciel. El Norte: The U.S.-Mexican Border in Contemporary Cinema. SCERP and IRSC publications, 1990.

External links 
 

1986 films
1986 action films
Mexican action films
1980s Spanish-language films
Films directed by Raúl Fernández
Mexican sequel films
1980s Mexican films